The International Examiner is a free biweekly Asian American newspaper based in Seattle, Washington's International District. It was founded in 1974 by Gerald Yuasa and Lawrence Imamura to serve what the founders thought were the business interests of the Asian American community in Seattle's International District.

In 1975, the Examiner was purchased by the Alaska Cannery Workers Association for $1 and became an activist, community-based newspaper. Although the paper became independent three years later, it continued the tradition of community activism that was firmly established under the Alaska Cannery Workers Association. As such, "editors" were also community activists and organizers rather than traditional journalists. As of 2004 its circulation was 10,000.

Today, the International Examiner is the oldest Asian American newspaper in the Northwest and the oldest continuously publishing pan-Asian newspaper in the country. The Examiner is a registered 501 (c)(3) non-profit organization governed by a volunteer Board of Directors.

See also
Ron Chew
International District
North American Post

External links
The International Examiner official website

Newspapers published in Seattle
Asian-American culture in Seattle
Asian-American press